Tim Folger is an American science and nature writer. He is a contributing editor at Discover Magazine and writes about science for several other magazines. Folger has been the "series editor" of The Best American Science and Nature Writing yearly anthology since 2002. He won the 2007 American Institute of Physics Science Writing Award.

Bibliography

References

External links
Official web site

American science writers
Living people
Year of birth missing (living people)
Discover (magazine) people
National Geographic people